Catocala ophelia is a moth of the family Erebidae. It is found in the dry forests of Arizona, California and south-western Oregon.

The wingspan is about 52 mm. Adults are on wing from July to October depending on the location. There is probably one generation per year.

The larvae feed on Quercus macrocarpa and Quercus chrysolepis.

Subspecies
Former subspecies Catocala ophelia dollii is now considered a synonym.

References

External links
Species info

ophelia
Moths described in 1880
Moths of North America